Algirdas Šocikas (14 May 1928 – 21 November 2012) was a Lithuanian amateur heavyweight boxer who won the European title in 1953 and 1955 and finished fifth at the 1952 Olympics. He won six Soviet (1950–1954, 1956), six Lithuanian (1947–1948, 1951–1953, 1956) and three Baltic championships (1948, 1950, 1952). After retiring in 1957 he worked as a boxing coach in Kaunas and raised the Olympic medalists Ričardas Tamulis and Jonas Čepulis, among others. He died in Kaunas, aged 84, and was buried in Petrašiūnai Cemetery.

References

1928 births
2012 deaths
Lithuanian male boxers
Olympic boxers of the Soviet Union
Boxers at the 1952 Summer Olympics
Lithuanian Sportsperson of the Year winners
Soviet male boxers
Recipients of the Order of Lenin
Honoured Masters of Sport of the USSR
Merited Coaches of the Soviet Union
Heavyweight boxers
Lithuanian Sports University alumni
Burials at Petrašiūnai Cemetery